Khalzan is a sum (district) of Sükhbaatar Province in eastern Mongolia. In 2020, its population was 1,751.

References 

Districts of Sükhbaatar Province